The 2020–21 Slovak Women's First League was the 27th season of the Slovak's top-tier football league for women also known as 1. liga, ženy and I Liga Women. Slovan Bratislava was the defending champions. The season was abandoned due COVID-19 pandemic in Slovakia.

Teams

Locations

League table

Results 
Each team plays home-and-away against every other team in the league, for a total of 18 matches each.

Controversy 
The Executive Committee of the Slovak Football Association has decided to cancel the 2020/2021 season in all youth and women's competitions conducted by the Slovak Football Association. At the time of approval this decision, Partizán Bardejov were in second place, three points behind Slovan who however played two more matches. Partizán even defeated Slovan in an away match and remained the only undefeated team in the league. The support for Partizán state also Slovak footballer Marek Hamšík.

As a consequence of this decision, Partizán did not apply to the next season and women's football in Bardejov ended due to financial problems. If they started in the Champions League, they earned prize money at least €90,000 which would be enough to fund club for the next season.

References

External links
 

2020–21 domestic women's association football leagues
2020–21 in Slovak football leagues